Reginald Burnette (born October 4, 1968) is a former linebacker in the National Football League.

He was born in Rayville, Louisiana.

Career
Burnette was drafted in the seventh round of the 1991 NFL Draft by the Green Bay Packers Burnette played three seasons in the NFL in the early 1990s. He played for the Green Bay Packers in 1991 and played for the Tampa Bay Buccaneers in 1992 and 1993.

He played at the collegiate level at the University of Houston.

References 

People from Rayville, Louisiana
Green Bay Packers players
Tampa Bay Buccaneers players
American football linebackers
University of Houston alumni
Houston Cougars football players
Living people
1968 births